Feni Government Pilot High School is a secondary school in the Feni District of Bangladesh. It is in the center of Feni and was established in 1886. Nabinchandra Sen, poet and Deputy Commissioner of Feni, established the school.Feni Government College is also on the same campus.

References

External links
 Official Forum of Feni Govt. Pilot High School

High schools in Bangladesh
1886 establishments in British India
Educational institutions established in 1886